Micrathetis dasarada is a moth of the family Noctuidae first described by Herbert Druce in 1898. It is found from Mexico to the Amazon basin, as well as on Jamaica and Cuba.

References

Moths described in 1898
Condicinae